Aleks Pihler (born 15 January 1994) is a Slovenian football midfielder who plays for Slovenian PrvaLiga side Maribor.

International career
Pihler got his first call up to the Slovenian national team for the 2018 FIFA World Cup qualifiers against Slovakia and England in October 2016. He made his debut on 14 November 2016 in a friendly against Poland.

Honours
Maribor
Slovenian Championship: 2016–17, 2018–19, 2021–22

References

External links
NZS profile 

1994 births
Living people
People from Ptuj
Slovenian footballers
Association football midfielders
NK Domžale players
NK Triglav Kranj players
NK Zavrč players
NK Maribor players
Slovenian PrvaLiga players
Slovenian Second League players
Slovenia youth international footballers
Slovenia under-21 international footballers
Slovenia international footballers